David Foster is a former professional rugby league footballer who played in the 1990s and 2000s.

Club career
David Foster played for Halifax in 1999's Super League IV, 2000's Super League V, and 2001's Super League VI.

References

External links
Stanley Rangers ARLFC - Roll of Honour

Living people
English rugby league players
Halifax R.L.F.C. players
Hunslet R.L.F.C. players
Keighley Cougars players
Oldham R.L.F.C. players
Place of birth missing (living people)
Rugby league centres
Rugby league hookers
Rugby league second-rows
Year of birth missing (living people)